Caerostris sexcuspidata, also known as the common bark spider, occurs in Southern Africa, and on islands off the east coast of Africa, such as Madagascar, the Comores and Aldabra Island. It is a mainly nocturnal orb-web spider, the female constructing a large orb web stretching between trees or shrubs. During daylight hours she dismantles her web and retires to a nearby branch, tucking her legs, which are covered with fine hair, against her body, to blend with the surroundings to resemble part of a branch, complete with growth bulges. Though mainly nocturnal, these spiders may be found on their webs in shady, forested areas during the day. The dorsal surface is cryptically coloured with horny projections which aid in camouflage; legs are drably coloured seen from above and clearly zebra-striped when viewed from beneath.  The common bark spider is the most widespread of the bark spiders found in Southern Africa and shows considerable variation in abdomen shape. The abdomen protrudes over the carapace, while the eight small eyes are located on a tubercle at the front of the carapace.

References

External links
Gallery
Gallery
iSpot post
The Photo Forum

Spiders of Africa
sexcuspidata
Spiders described in 1793